Emiri (written: 笑里, 英美里, 絵美里 or えみり in hiragana) is a feminine Japanese given name. Notable people with the name include:

, Japanese actress and singer
, Japanese voice actress
, Japanese violinist
, Japanese model

Fictional characters
, a character in the light novel series Haruhi Suzumiya

Japanese feminine given names